Acanthurus thompsoni is a tropical fish found in the Pacific and Indian Oceans. It is commonly known as the Thompson's surgeonfish. It is commercial in aquarium use.

References

External links
 

Acanthuridae
Acanthurus
Fish described in 1923